Veterans for Victory may refer to:

 A South African Apartheid government front organization
 An American Conservative PAC front organization